Elaeocarpus stellaris is a species of flowering plant in the family Elaeocarpaceae and is endemic to north-eastern Queensland. It is a tree, sometimes with buttress roots at the base of the trunk, elliptic to egg-shaped leaves, small groups of flowers with greenish-yellow sepals and creamy-white petals, the fruit containing a five-flanged stone.

Description
There are about fifty stamens. This species is similar to E. bancroftii apart from the flanged stone.

Taxonomy
Elaeocarpus stellaris was first formally described in 1969 by Lindsay Stuart Smith in Contributions from the Queensland Herbarium from material he collected Gregory Falls west of Innisfail.

Distribution and habitat

Conservation status
This quandong is listed as of "least concern" under the Queensland Government Nature Conservation Act 1992.

References

stellaris
Oxalidales of Australia
Flora of Queensland
Plants described in 1969
Endemic flora of Australia
Taxa named by Lindsay Stuart Smith